Robert L. Middleton (January 22, 1941 – June 25, 2010) was an American football player and coach. He served as the head football coach at Ohio Northern University in Ada, Ohio from 1970 to 1973, compiling a record of 15–21. A college football player at Ohio State University under Woody Hayes, Middleton was drafted by the Buffalo Bills in the 1963 AFL Draft.

References

1941 births
2010 deaths
American football ends
Ohio Northern Polar Bears football coaches
Ohio State Buckeyes football players
High school football coaches in Michigan